The 2009 GCC U-17 Championship took place in the UAE between September 5, 2009 and September 14, 2009. Six nations have entered the tournament, two more than the previous tournament held in Saudi Arabia.

Saudi Arabia is the defending champion.

Groups

Group Stage Standings & Results

Group A

Group B

Semi-finals

5th Place Playoff

One off match between 3rd place group stage teams

3rd Place Playoff

One off match between semi final losers

Final

Winners

Awards

Goalscorers

3 goals:
  Fahad AlMouallad
  Mubarak Salim
  Badr Mubarak
2 goals:
  Yousif Saeed
  Soud Adailam AlEnazi
  Mohammed AlHabsi
1 goals:
  Majed Shahin
  Saeed ali
  salah ali
  Abdullah Sultan
  Mohamed jamal
  Khamis Araimi
  Yassin Juma
  Mohammed AlFahad
  Abdallah Al-Ammar
  jawhar Ahmed
  Faris Al-Ahmadi
  abdallah AlFahad
  Abulrahman AL-omairi
  Fahad Almalki
  Ahmad ali

Top scoring teams

10 goals 

7 goals 

 6 goals 

 4 goals 

 3 goals 

 2 goals

See also 
Football at the Southeast Asian Games
AFC
AFC Asian Cup
East Asian Cup
Arabian Gulf Cup
South Asian Football Federation Cup
West Asian Football Federation Championship

 

Gulf
2009
Gulf
GCC U-17 Championship
2009 in youth association football